The Federal Minister of Defence is the head of the Federal Ministry of Defence and a member of the Federal Cabinet.

According to Article 65a of the German Constitution, the Federal Minister of Defence is commander-in-chief of the German armed forces, the Bundeswehr, in peacetime. Conversely, when a state of defence is declared, the Federal Chancellor becomes commander-in-chief. The highest-ranking military officer in the Bundeswehr is the Inspector General of the Bundeswehr.

The most recent individual to have served as Federal Minister of Defence is Christine Lambrecht, who served from 8 December 2021 until her resignation from the office of Federal Minister of Defence on 16 January 2023. As of 19 January 2023, Boris Pistorius is the incumbent Federal Minister of Defence.

List of officeholders

Ministers of Defence, 1919–1935

Minister of War, 1935–1938

In 1938 the Ministry of War was abolished and replaced by the Oberkommando der Wehrmacht (OKW), as a result of the Blomberg–Fritsch affair.

Chief of the OKW (de facto Minister of War, 1938–1945)

Minister of War, 1945

Ministers of Defence of the GDR, 1956–1990

Ministers of Defence (Bundesminister der Verteidigung), since 1955

|-style="text-align:center;"

References

External links
 bmvg.de

Defence

Germany